Edward Weldon Tunstel from Johns Hopkins University Applied Physics Laboratory, Laurel, MD was named Fellow of the Institute of Electrical and Electronics Engineers (IEEE) in 2012 for contributions to space robotic system applications on planetary missions.

References

Fellow Members of the IEEE
Living people
Year of birth missing (living people)
Place of birth missing (living people)